The Communards were a British synth-pop duo formed in London in 1985. The duo consisted of Jimmy Somerville and Richard Coles. They are most famous for their cover versions of "Don't Leave Me This Way", originally by Harold Melvin & the Blue Notes featuring Teddy Pendergrass and the Jackson 5's "Never Can Say Goodbye".

The name Communards refers to the revolutionaries of the 1871 Paris Commune.

History 
The Communards formed in 1985 after singer Jimmy Somerville left his earlier band Bronski Beat to team up with classically trained musician Richard Coles. Somerville often used a falsetto singing style. Coles, though mainly a pianist, played a number of instruments and had been seen previously performing the clarinet solos on the Bronski Beat hit "It Ain't Necessarily So". They were joined by bass player Dave Renwick who had also played with Bronski Beat.

The band had their first UK top 30 hit in 1985 with the piano-based number 30 single "You Are My World". The following year, they had their biggest hit with an energetic hi-NRG cover version of Harold Melvin and the Blue Notes' soul classic "Don't Leave Me This Way" (in a version inspired by Thelma Houston's cover) which spent four weeks at number one and became the UK's biggest selling single of 1986. It also made the US top 40. It featured Sarah Jane Morris as co-vocalist, taking advantage of the contrast between Morris' deep and rounded contralto and Somerville's soaring falsetto.

On one Top Of The Pops show, Morris and Somerville changed roles (the song was being mimed) so that Somerville appeared to sing the deep notes and Morris the high ones.

Morris performed both backing and co-lead vocals on many of the Communards' other recordings, and appeared in group photos as an unofficial third member.

Later that year, the Communards had another UK top 10 hit with the single "So Cold the Night", which reached number 8. In 1987, they released an album titled Red, which was partly produced by Stephen Hague. Red featured a cover version of the Jackson 5 hit "Never Can Say Goodbye" (in a version inspired by Gloria Gaynor's cover), which the Communards took to number 4 on the UK chart. Their last released single was "There's More to Love (Than Boy Meets Girl)" in 1988, which reached number 20 and was their final top 20 hit. And "Tomorrow" also released as a single.
 Red is also noteworthy for "Victims" and "For a Friend" (also released as a single), which address people living with, and having died from, HIV/AIDS. 
The Communards split in 1988. Somerville pursued a solo musical career, while Coles was ordained as an Anglican priest in 2005, serving as a parish priest in Northamptonshire until his retirement in 2022.

Discography

 Communards (1986)
 Red (1987)

See also 
 Banderas – Communards offshoot featuring backing musician Sally Herbert
 Jimmy Somerville discography
 June Miles-Kingston
 List of artists who reached number one on the US Dance chart
 List of number-one dance hits (United States)

References

 
British hi-NRG groups
British pop music duos
English synth-pop groups
Dance-pop groups
LGBT-themed musical groups
Male musical duos
Musical groups established in 1985
Musical groups disestablished in 1988
Musical groups from London
1985 establishments in England
London Records artists